EuroLeague Women 2007–08 Knockout Stage are the main rounds of EuroLeague Women 2007-08, included Eighth-Finals and Quarter-Finals.

Elimination rounds

Eighth-Finals

First leg
February 5, 2008

Second leg
February 8, 2008

Third leg
February 13, 2008

Quarter-finals

First leg

February 26, 2008

Second leg
February 29, 2008

Third leg
March 5, 2008

Knockout
2007–08 in Russian basketball
2007–08 in French basketball
2007–08 in Turkish basketball
2007–08 in Hungarian basketball
2007–08 in Italian basketball
2007–08 in Spanish women's basketball
2007–08 in Czech basketball
2007–08 in Lithuanian basketball
2007–08 in Polish basketball